The intercostal arteries are a group of arteries that supply the area between the ribs ("costae"), called the intercostal space. The highest intercostal artery (supreme intercostal artery or superior intercostal artery) is an artery in the human body that usually gives rise to the first and second posterior intercostal arteries, which supply blood to their corresponding intercostal space.  It usually arises from the costocervical trunk, which is a branch of the subclavian artery.  Some anatomists may contend that there is no supreme intercostal artery, only a supreme intercostal vein.

The anterior intercostal branches of internal thoracic artery supply the upper five or six intercostal spaces. The internal thoracic artery (previously called as internal mammary artery) then divides into the superior epigastric artery and musculophrenic artery. The latter gives out the remaining anterior intercostal branches. Two in number in each space, these small vessels pass lateralward, one lying near the lower margin of the rib above, and the other near the upper margin of the rib below, and anastomose with the posterior intercostal arteries from the thoracic aorta.

They are at first situated between the pleurae and the intercostales interni, and then between the intercostales interni and innermost. They supply the intercostal muscles and, by branches which perforate the intercostales externi, the pectoral muscles and the mamma.

The musculophrenic artery arises from the internal thoracic artery, directed obliquely downward and laterally, behind the cartilages of the false ribs; it perforates the diaphragm at the eighth or ninth costal cartilage, and ends, considerably reduced in size, opposite the last intercostal space.

It gives off intercostal branches to the seventh, eighth, and ninth intercostal spaces; these diminish in size as the spaces decrease in length, and are distributed in a manner precisely similar to the intercostal arteries from the internal thoracic artery.

The musculophrenic artery also gives branches to the lower part of the pericardium, and others which run backward to the diaphragm, and downward to the abdominal muscles.

The posterior intercostal arteries are arteries that supply blood to the intercostal spaces.

There are eleven posterior intercostal arteries on each side.

 The 1st and 2nd posterior intercostal arteries arise from the supreme intercostal artery, a branch of the costocervical trunk of the subclavian artery.
 The lower nine arteries are the aortic intercostals, so called because they arise from the back of the thoracic aorta.

The right aortic intercostals are longer than the left because of the position of the aorta on the left side of the vertebral column; they pass across the bodies of the vertebrae behind the esophagus, thoracic duct, and azygos vein, and are covered by the right lung and pleura.

The left aortic intercostals run backward on the sides of the vertebrae and are covered by the left lung and pleura; the upper two vessels are crossed by the left superior intercostal vein, the lower vessels by the hemiazygos vein.

Opposite the heads of the ribs, the sympathetic trunk passes downward in front of them, and the splanchnic nerves also descend in front by the lower arteries.

Each artery then divides into an anterior and a posterior ramus.

A given posterior intercostal artery travels along the bottom of the rib with its corresponding posterior intercostal vein, as well as the intercostal nerve of the given space.  The vein is superior to the artery, and the intercostal nerve is inferior to it. Commonly, the mnemonic, "Van," is used to recall the order of the vein, artery and nerve, from superior to inferior.

See also 
 Supreme intercostal vein
 Superior intercostal vein
 Posterior intercostal veins
 Intercostal nerves

References

External links 
  - "Thoracic wall: Branches of the Internal Thoracic Artery"
 http://www.instantanatomy.net/thorax/vessels/aupperintercostalarteries.html
  - "Branches of the ascending aorta, arch of the aorta, and the descending aorta."
 
 

Arteries of the thorax
Medical mnemonics